Dimethylphosphine is the organophosphorus compound with the formula (CH3)2PH, often written Me2PH.  It is a malodorous gas that condenses to a colorless liquid just below room temperature. Although it can be produced by methylation of phosphine, a more practical synthesis involves the reduction of tetramethyldiphosphine disulfide with tributylphosphine:
[Me2P(S)]2  +  PBu3  +  H2O   →   Me2PH  +  SPBu3  +  Me2P(O)H

Reactions
The compound exhibits the properties characteristic of a secondary phosphine, i.e., a compound of the type R2PH.  It can be oxidized to the phosphinic acid:
Me2PH  +  O2  →   Me2PO2H
It protonates to give the phosphonium ion:
Me2PH  +  H+  →   Me2PH2+
With strong bases, it can be deprotonated to give dimethylphosphide derivatives:
Me2PH  +  LiNH2  →   Me2PLi  +  NH3

References

Phosphines
Foul-smelling chemicals